That Was Yesterday may refer to:

 "That Was Yesterday" (Donna Fargo song)
 "That Was Yesterday" (Foreigner song)